Cleverley is an English surname. Notable people with this surname include the following:

 Alf Cleverley (1907–1972), New Zealand boxer
 Ben Cleverley (b. 1981), British footballer
 Charlotte Cleverley-Bisman (b. 2003), New Zealand vaccination campaign representative
 Daisy Cleverley (b. 1997), New Zealand footballer
 Don Cleverley (1909–2004), New Zealand cricketer
 Samuel Cleverley (d. 1824), British physician
 Tom Cleverley (b. 1989), English football player, who plays for Watford

See also
Cleverly

English-language surnames